A morphogram is the representation of a morpheme by a grapheme based solely on its meaning. Kanji is a writing system that make use of morphograms, where Chinese characters were borrowed to represent native morphemes because of their meanings. Thus, a single character can represent a variety of morphemes which originally all had the same meaning. An example of this in Japanese would be the grapheme 東 [east], which can be read as higashi or azuma, in addition to its logographic representation of the morpheme tō. Additionally, in Japanese, the logographic (Chinese-derived) reading is called the on'yomi reading, and the morphographic reading (native Japanese) is called the kun'yomi reading.

See also
 Logogram

References
 Smith, J.S. (1996). Japanese Writing. In P.T. Daniels & W. Bright (Eds.), The World’s Writing Systems (pp. 209–217). New York, NY: Oxford University Press, Inc.

Writing systems
Graphemes
Logographic writing systems
Linguistic morphology